Kiremithane station is the railway station of Yüreğir district, in the city of Adana. The station is served by one regional and one long-distance line.

The Kiremithane railway station has no station buildings. The only infrastructure present at the station is the waiting shelter. Tickets can be purchased inside the train because there is no ticket booth in the station.

External links
Kiremithane Gar - Train Schedule

References

Transport in Adana
Buildings and structures in Adana
Railway stations in Adana Province
Railway stations opened in 1912
1912 establishments in the Ottoman Empire